Necessary Evil, is the fifth solo album by the American singer Deborah Harry. Released in September 2007, it was her first solo album in fourteen years. The album contains fourteen tracks (seventeen in some territories), including the first single "Two Times Blue", released on the iTunes Store on June 6, 2007. Harry promoted the album on Cyndi Lauper's True Colors Tour 2007, performing a number of songs from the album. Upon its release in the UK, it debuted at #86. In the US, it debuted at #37 on the Independent Chart.

In several interviews, Harry said the album was recorded slowly. At first, the project was just a handful of songs from over a few years that she had never intended to develop into a full album. Then, before she knew it, she was working with Barb Morrison and Charles Nieland of production team Super Buddha and found herself on the Eleven Seven Music label.

On January 18, 2008, an official music video for "If I Had You" was released.

Track listing

Personnel
Deborah Harry – vocals, guitar (track 8), percussion (track 10)

With
Tracks 1–14
Super Buddha – all instruments, except as noted
Mark Marone – drums (tracks 2–4, 14)
Sean Travis Dempsey – keyboards and drum programming (track 9)
Miss Guy – additional vocals (track 14)
Tracks 15–16
Chris Stein – all instruments
Track 17
Roy Nathanson – saxophone
Bill Ware – all other instruments

Release history

References

Debbie Harry albums
2007 albums
Eleven Seven Label Group albums
Albums produced by Chris Stein
Albums produced by Barb Morrison
Albums produced by Bill Ware